Las Vega's is a Chilean television soap opera created by Javier Cuchacovic and Nicolas Wellmann, that aired on Canal 13 from March 17, to July 18, 2013, starring Francisca Imboden, Lorena Bosch, María Jose Bello, and Josefina Montané.

Cast

Main characters 
 Francisca Imboden as Verónica Díaz.
 Lorena Bosch as Mariana Vega.
 María José Bello as Antonia Vega.
 Josefina Montané as Camila Vega.

Supporting characters 
Related to Las Vega's club
 Cristián Arriagada as Pedro Vargas
 Cristián Campos as José Luis "Coto" Bravo
 Mario Horton as Vicente Acuña
 Álvaro Gómez as Robinson Martínez
 Ignacio Garmendia as Juan Pablo Vallejos
 Pablo Macaya as Mauro Durán / Ricardo "Richi" Álvarez

Others
 Julio Milostich as Álvaro Sandoval
 Catalina Guerra as Rocío Muñoz
 Claudio Arredondo as Germán Soto
 Katty Kowaleczko as Teresa Acuña
 Héctor Morales as Benjamín Ossandón
 Verónica Soffia as Natalia Silva
 Pablo Schwarz as Boris Vallejos
 Paula Sharim as Magdalena Gutiérrez
 Paulo Brunetti as Javier Riesco
 Antonella Orsini as Lorena Riesco / Lorena Bravo
 Cristóbal Tapia-Montt as Carlitos "Charly" Vega
 Fedra Vergara as Belén Valdebenito
 Martín Castillo as Renzo Zapata

Guest appearances 
 Alejandro Trejo as Carlos Vega
 Ramón Farías as Hernán Aguirre
 Sandra O'Ryan as Fernanda Valdés
 Pablo Ausensi as Vicente's chief
 Verónica González as Luisa
 Noelia Arias as Roxana Olivera
 Felipe Ríos as Saúl
 Eduardo Cumar as trader
 Catalina Olcay as Jéssica Pavez
 Javier Baldassare as Gutiérrez.
 Matias Stevens as Novio.
 Loreto González as Daniela.
 Sebastián Arrigorriaga as Cristián
 Teresa Munchmeyer as Señora Ana
 Agustín Moya as Sr. Acuña
 Edinson Díaz as Rubén / Ramón
 Nathalia Aragonese as Scarlet
 Christian Ocaranza as Alex
 Gabriel Martina as Pibe
 María Eugenia García-Huidobro as Vanessa
 Aldo Parodi as the theater professor
 Mariana Prat as the Kindergarten director
 Luz María Yacometti as the lady of civil registration
 Martín Carcamo (cameo)
 Tonka Tomicic (cameo)
 Francisco Saavedra (actor) (cameo)
 Dominique Gallego (cameo)

International broadcast 
 Mexico: XHST-TDT.
 Paraguay: La Tele (2014-2015).
 Peru: Willax.
 South Africa: Star Novela E1.
 Venezuela: Televen (2014).

International versions 
 Colombia: Las Vega's (2016).
 Mexico: Las Bravo (2014).

References

External links 
 Official website 

2013 telenovelas
Chilean telenovelas
2013 Chilean television series debuts
2013 Chilean television series endings
Canal 13 (Chilean TV channel) telenovelas
Spanish-language telenovelas